Bakhsh Kandi (also Romanized as Bakhsh Kandī) is a village in Lakestan Rural District, in the Central District of Salmas County, West Azerbaijan Province, Iran. At the 2006 census, its population was 366, in 91 families.

References 

Populated places in Salmas County